Gol Tappeh-ye Qurmish (also Romanized as Gol Tappeh-ye Qūrmīsh; also known as Kal-e Tappeh Qūrmīsh) is a village in Behi Dehbokri Rural District, Simmineh District, Bukan County, West Azerbaijan Province, Iran. At the 2006 census, its population was 330, in 61 families.

References 

Populated places in Bukan County